William Henry Angas (6 October 1781 – 9 September 1832), was an English sailor missionary. He was born at Newcastle upon Tyne and was a brother of George Fife Angas. He went to sea and was captured by a French privateer, and imprisoned for a year and a half. He afterwards commanded ships of his father's, then became a Baptist minister in 1817 after a year's study at Edinburgh. In 1822 he was appointed missionary to seafaring men by the British and Foreign Seamen's Friend Society and Bethel Union. He travelled to various ports and foreign countries for religious purposes, and was serving a chapel at South Shields, when he died of cholera 9 September 1832.

References

Attribution

1781 births
1832 deaths
English Baptist missionaries
People from Newcastle upon Tyne
19th-century Baptists